The Jinan Military Region was a PLA Military Region located in the east of the People's Republic of China, covering the Shandong and Henan Provinces, which also formed military districts. It appears that Yang Dezhi was one of the first commander of the Jinan MR, from 1958. It was considered a strategic reserve. It included some of the area previously within the Wuhan Military Region, which was disbanded in 1985–88.

The 5th Air Corps was established in Weifeng, Shandong Province, in 1952, possibly from the disbanding 11th Corps, but was moved to Hangzhou in the Nanjing Military Region by 1954.

After 1975 the 46th Army was transferred from Xuzhou, Jiangsu Province to Linyi, Shandong. It was disestablished in 1985. There were previously three Group Armies within the Region, the 20th Group Army at Kaifeng, the 26th Group Army at Weifang, and the 54th in Xinxiang. It previously included the now disbanded 67th Group Army.

The Jinan Military Region was disbanded in the reorganisation of 2015–16, being split between the Northern Theatre Command and the Central Theatre Command.

Structure 
In 2006, the International Institute for Strategic Studies attributed the formation with 190,000 personnel, including two armoured divisions, one mechanised infantry division, three motorised infantry divisions, one artillery division, one armoured brigade, one mechanised infantry brigade, four motorised infantry brigades, two artillery brigades, three anti-aircraft brigades, and an anti-tank regiment.

20th Group Army (Kaifeng, Henan)
11th Armoured Brigade with 20th Group Army at Xuchang.
other units
26th Group Army (Weifang, Shandong)
54th Group Army (Xinxiang, Henan)
127th Mechanized Infantry Division within 54th Group Army, at Luoyang, a ready reaction unit
162nd Motorized Infantry Division
11th Armored Division (Xianyang)
Artillery Brigade (Jiaozou, Henan)
1st Air Defence Brigade (Xingyang)
1st Army Aviation Regiment (Xinxiang)

In the Military Balance 2014, the IISS listed the Jinan Military Region Air Force as consisting of the 5th Aviation Division, with two attack regiments; the 12th Fighter Division, with three fighter regiments; the 19th Fighter Division, with two fighter and one training regiment; the 32nd Aviation Division with one fighter and one training regiment; a Flight Instructor Training Base; and four surface-to-air missile battalions. (IISS 2014, 238).

Commanders and commissars, 2010-2015 
 Zhao Zongqi (Commander), since November 2012
 Wang Jun (Deputy Commander), since December 2011
 Ji Wenming (Deputy Commander), since July 2014
 Liu Zhigang (Deputy Commander), since December 2014
 Zhang Ming (Chief-of-Staff), since December 2014
Du Hengyan (Political Commissar), since July 2010
 Lü Jiancheng (Deputy Political Commissar), since July 2010
 Wu Shezhou (Political Department Director) since December 2014

Nickname
Organizations affiliated with the Jinan Military Region often use the nickname "vanguard", including the Vanguard Performance Troupe and the Vanguard Newspaper.

Notes

References 
 International Institute for Strategic Studies, The Military Balance 2006
 Chapter 8, PLA Ground Forces, by Dennis J Blasko, in The People's Liberation Army as Organisation, RAND, CF182
 http://www.sinodefence.com
 

 
Military regions of the People's Liberation Army
Military units and formations disestablished in 2016